Irad can refer to:

Irad, a Biblical name
Irad, son of Enoch, a character in the Bible
Irad, Kentucky
Irad Young (born 1971), American-Israeli soccer player 
Arad, Iran, which has the alternative name "Irad"